The Indian Ocean Experiment (INDOEX) was a 1999 multinational scientific study designed to measure the transport of air pollution from Southeast Asia into the Indian Ocean. The project was led by Veerabhadran Ramanathan.

Findings
 Plumes of sulfates, smoke particles, and other anthropogenic aerosols blowing over the Indian Ocean was blocking sunlight and promoting cloud formation. 
 The amount of sunlight reaching the Earth's surface was reduced by 10%.

See also
Asian brown cloud
Veerabhadran Ramanathan

References

Atmospheric sciences
Air pollution